The Copeland–Erdős constant is the concatenation of "0." with the base 10 representations of the prime numbers in order. Its value, using the modern definition of prime, is approximately

0.235711131719232931374143… .

The constant is irrational; this can be proven with Dirichlet's theorem on arithmetic progressions or Bertrand's postulate (Hardy and Wright, p. 113) or Ramare's theorem that every even integer is a sum of at most six primes. It also follows directly from its normality (see below).

By a similar argument, any constant created by concatenating "0."  with all primes in an arithmetic progression dn + a, where a is coprime to d and to 10, will be irrational; for example, primes of the form 4n + 1 or 8n + 1.  By Dirichlet's theorem, the arithmetic progression dn · 10m + a contains primes for all m, and those primes are also in cd + a, so the concatenated primes contain arbitrarily long sequences of the digit zero.

In base 10, the constant is a normal number, a fact proven by Arthur Herbert Copeland and Paul Erdős in 1946 (hence the name of the constant).

The constant is given by

where pn is the nth prime number.

Its continued fraction is [0; 4, 4, 8, 16, 18, 5, 1, …].

Related constants

For example, the sequence  satisfies these conditions, so the constant 0.003712192634435363748597110122136… is normal in base 10, and 0.003101525354661104…7 is normal in base 7.

In any given base b the number

 

which can be written in base b as 0.0110101000101000101…b
where the nth digit is 1 if and only if n is prime, is irrational.

See also
Smarandache–Wellin numbers: the truncated value of this constant multiplied by the appropriate power of 10.
Champernowne constant: concatenating all natural numbers, not just primes.

References

Sources
.
.

External links

Paul Erdős
Irrational numbers
Prime numbers
Mathematical constants